An aberration is something that deviates from the normal way.

Aberration may also refer to:

Biology and medicine 
Form (zoology) or aberration, a rare mutant butterfly or moth wing pattern
Cardiac aberrancy, aberration in the shape of the EKG signal
Chromosome aberration, abnormal number or structure of chromosomes

Entertainment
Aberration, a DLC for the video game Ark: Survival Evolved
Aberration (film), a 1997 horror film
Aberration (EP), by Neurosis, 1989
Aberrations, or abbies, human-like creatures in the American TV series Wayward Pines

Optics and physics
Astronomical aberration, phenomenon wherein objects appear to move about their true positions in the sky
Chromatic aberration, failure of a lens to focus all colors on the same point
Defocus aberration, in which an image is out of focus
Optical aberration, an imperfection in image formation by an optical system
Relativistic aberration, the distortion of light at high velocities
Spherical aberration, which occurs when light rays pass through a spherical lens near the edge

See also
Aberrant, a superhero role-playing game by White Wolf Game Studio
Aberrancy (geometry), the non-circularity of a curve
Abomination (Bible), a term used in Bible
Freak (disambiguation)